Arber is a surname. Notable people with the surname include:

Agnes Arber (1879–1960), British botanist and philosopher of biology
Edward Arber (1836–1912), British academic and writer
Edward Alexander Newell Arber,  British paleobotanist
Silvia Arber (born 1968), Swiss neurobiologist
Werner Arber (born 1929), Swiss microbiologist and geneticist

See also
Arbour (surname)
Großer Arber, a mountain in Bavaria
Kleiner Arber, a mountain in Bavaria
HD 82886 b, an exoplanet officially named Arber,  orbiting Illyrian (HD 82886)